"Sweet Nothing" is a song by American singer-songwriter Taylor Swift, taken from her tenth studio album Midnights (2022). It was written by Swift and Joe Alwyn (under the pseudonym William Bowery), with Swift and Jack Antonoff producing it. "Sweet Nothing" is a gentle ballad reminiscent of the 1970s torch songs.

Lyrically, "Sweet Nothing" is a love song that sees Swift compliment her lover for his lack of expectations and his calming presence amidst the chaos that comes with her stardom. The song was met with widespread critical acclaim, with appraisal towards its intimate lyrics, tender melodic composition, and subtle production, with some picking it as one of the finest tracks on Midnights. Commercially, "Sweet Nothing" charted within the top-20 in Australia, Canada, the Philippines, Singapore, and the United States, upon the album's release.

Background 
At the 2022 MTV Video Music Awards on August 28, 2022, Taylor Swift announced her tenth studio album when she won Video of the Year for All Too Well: The Short Film, set to release on October 21, 2022. Shortly after, Swift revealed the title, Midnights, and its album cover but the track-list was not revealed. British actor, Joe Alwyn has previously worked with Swift on two of her 2020 studio albums, Folklore and Evermore under the pseudonym, William Bowery. On 2022, Alwyn was enlisted in her new album as a co-writer of "Sweet Nothing". Jack Antonoff, a long time collaborator of Swift, who had worked with her since her fifth studio album, 1989 (2014), was confirmed as a producer on Midnights by a video posted to Swift's Instagram account on September 16, 2022, titled "The making of Midnights".

On September 21, 2022, a month before Midnights release, she announced a thirteen-episode short series called Midnights Mayhem With Me that will be released on the social media platform TikTok. The video series purpose is to announce a song title through a telephone every episode by rolling a lottery cage containing thirteen ping pong balls numbered one to thirteen, each ball representing a track. On October 7, Swift revealed "Sweet Nothing" as the eleventh track of the album alongside "Lavender Haze", "You're on Your Own, Kid", and "Labyrinth" a few hours previously. The "Piano Remix" of the song was included on the CD Deluxe edition of Midnights titled Lavender Edition.

Composition and lyrics 
"Sweet Nothing" is three minutes and eight seconds long. Swift wrote the song with Alwyn (credited as William Bowery) and produced it with Antonoff. The song was recorded at Rough Customer Studio (Brooklyn), and Electric Lady Studios (New York City). Antonoff engineered and programmed the song. He plays the drums, percussion, Moog, Juno 6, modular synth, Prophet 5 and piano, and Evan Smith plays the organ, saxophone, flute, and clarinet. Randy Merrill mastered it at MixStar Studios (Virginia Beach), Serban Ghenea mixed it with the assistance of Bryce Bordone at Sterling Sound (Edgewater, New Jersey), and Evan Smith and Laura Sisk engineered the song with the assistance of Megan Searl, John Sher, and John Rooney.

"Sweet Nothing" is a tender, dreamy song, driven by electric piano and saxophone, imitating 1970s ballads. The climax includes horn stings. The title of the song references the expression of "sweet nothing", an unmeaning romantic gesture that occur between lovers. "Sweet Nothing" is a love song, Swift compliments her lover for his lack of expectations and describes him as a calm and reliable presence, contrasted to the hectic stardom outside. The song opens with a pebble being picked up in the shores of Wicklow, an Irish county where Alwyn filmed the Hulu show, Conversation With Friends. In the bridge, it's about the celebrating the sharing of your most vulnerable feelings and fears with your partner.

Critical reception 
"Sweet Nothing" received widespread critical acclaim from critics. Alex Hopper of American Songwriter described the song as "buoyantly free" and "delightfully naive", calling it a "simple gem". Ranking every Midnights' track, Billboard journalist Jason Lipshutz placed it as the album's eighth best track, saying Swift's subtle gestures is one of the album's most affecting. Entertainment Weekly'''s Marc Hirsh called the song "charming" for portraying Swift devoting to someone who demands nothing for her. Courteney Lacrossa of Insider dubbed "Sweet Nothing" as "the softest and most sensitive" track because of its specificity. Callie Ahlgrim alongside Lacrossa selected it as the Midnights track that "gives [her] chills everytime". Rick Quinn from PopMatters picked "Sweet Nothing" as one of the songs that showcases Swift's ability to "enunciate and play with where the emphatic accent falls become rhythmic instruments." Neil McCormick of The Daily Telegraph hailed the "gossamer-light, flyaway ballad" as the album's finest song. Esquire selected "Sweet Nothing" among the 45 best songs of 2022.

Commercial performance
After Midnights' release, "Sweet Nothing" entered the Billboard Global 200 at number 14 alongside the standard edition's 12 other tracks, all of which debuted inside the top-15 of the Global 200. In the United States, the song debuted and peaked at number 14 on the Billboard Hot 100. It charted on the Canadian Hot 100 at number 15 and was certified gold from Music Canada on November 29, 2022. "Sweet Nothing" reached various single charts, at number 12 in the Philippines, number 14 in Australia, number 15 in Singapore, number 16 in Malaysia, number 27 in Vietnam, number 34 in Portugal, number 59 in Sweden, number 66 in Czech Republic, number 70 in Switzerland, number 72 in Lithuania, number 78 in Slovakia, and number 89 in Spain.

 Credits and personnel 
Credits are adapted from the liner notes of Midnights''.
Recording
 Recorded at Rough Customer Studio, Brooklyn and Electric Lady Studios, New York City
 Mixed at MixStar Studios, Virginia Beach
 Mastered at Sterling Sound, Edgewater, New Jersey
 Evan Smith's performance was recorded by herself at Pleasure Hill Recording, Portland, Maine

Personnel
 Taylor Swift – vocals, songwriting, production
 William Bowery – songwriting
 Jack Antonoff – production, engineering, programming, drums, percussion, Moog, Juno 6, modular synth, Prophet 5, piano, recording
 Evan Smith – engineering, organ, saxophone, flute, clarinet
 Megan Searl – engineering assistance
 John Sher – engineering assistance
 John Rooney – engineering assistance
 Serban Ghenea – mixing
 Bryce Bordone – mixing assistance
 Randy Merrill – mastering
 Laura Sisk – engineering, recording

Charts

Certifications

References 

2022 songs
Taylor Swift songs
Songs written by Taylor Swift
Songs written by Joe Alwyn
Song recordings produced by Taylor Swift
Song recordings produced by Jack Antonoff